The archery competitions at the 2019 Southeast Asian Games in Philippines took place at Clark Parade Grounds in Mabalacat, Philippines from 5 to 9 December 2019.

The 2019 Games featured competitions in ten events (men 4 events, women 4 events and mixed 2 events).

Men's individual recurve

Qualification round

Knockout round

Women's individual recurve

Qualification round

Knockout round

Men's team recurve

Seeding round

Knockout round

Women's team recurve

Seeding round

Knockout round

Mixed team recurve

Seeding round

Knockout round

Men's individual compound

Qualification round

Knockout round

Women's individual compound

Qualification round

Knockout round

Men's team compound

Seeding round

Knockout round

Women's team compound

Seeding round

Knockout round

Mixed team compound

Seeding round

Knockout round

References

External links
  

R
Southeast Asian Games
2019 in women's archery